Events in the year 1907 in Norway.

Incumbents
Monarch – Haakon VII
Prime Minister – Christian Michelsen

Events

 14 June – Norway adopts female suffrage in parliamentary elections.
 Norsk Hydro, having been founded in 1905, opens up its first plant at Notodden.
 Municipal and county elections are held throughout the country.
 The construction of the Bergen Line is completed.

Popular culture

Sports

Music

Film

Literature
 The first Olav Duun novel Løglege skruvar og anna folk (Sogor) (Oddballs and Other People (Stories)) was published.

Notable births
5 January – Sunniva Hakestad Møller, politician (died 1995)
9 January – Haakon Hansen, boxer (died 1985)
14 January – Christian S. Oftedal, politician (died 1955)
16 January – Arne Skaare, politician (died 1981)
4 February – Eva Lund Haugen, author and editor in America (died 1996)
5 February – Birgith Dalland, politician
24 February – Karl Valdemar Westerlund, politician (died 1997)
27 February – Øistein Jakobsen, politician (died 1947)
2 March – Kai Fjell, painter, printmaker and scenographer (died 1989)
8 March – Rolf Jacobsen, writer (died 1994)
13 March – Ingvald Bjerke, boxer (died 1990)
16 March – Hans Kleppen, ski jumper and Olympic bronze medallist (died 2009)
19 March – Arthur Olsen II, boxer (died 1943)
29 March – Berte Rognerud, politician (died 1997)
3 April – Lars Breie, jurist, auditor and politician (died 1999)
10 April – Aase Lionæs, politician (died 1999)
5 May – Haakon Hansen, politician (died 1971)
18 May – Lars Amandus Aasgard, politician (died 1984)
20 May – Per Lie, labour activist (died 1945)
28 June – Odd Bull, air force officer, Chief of Air Staff (died 1991)
31 July – Sigurd Vestad, cross country skier (died 2001)
10 August – Ragnvald Marensius Gundersen, politician (died 1985)
16 August – Edvard Natvig, decathlete (died 1994)
22 August – Einar Normann Rasmussen, politician (died 1975)
25 August – Wilhelm Engel Bredal, politician (died 1966)
13 September – Oskar Slaaen, politician (died 1972)
18 October – Einar Høigård, educator (died 1943).
19 October – Kristian Birger Gundersen, politician (died 1977)
26 October – Martha Frederikke Johannessen, politician (died 1973)
14 November – Kåre Norum, educator (died 1981).
19 November – Gunnar Halle, engineer and military officer.
25 December – Kristian Johansson, ski jumper and World Champion
30 December – Sigmund Ruud, ski jumper, Olympic silver medallist and World Champion (died 1994).

Full date unknown
Gerda Grepp, war correspondent (died 1940)
Ørnulf Bast, sculptor (died 1974)
Per Bratland, newspaper editor (died 1988)
Thorbjørn Feyling, ceramist and designer (died 1985)
Nils Langhelle, politician and Minister (died 1967)
Knut Tjønneland, politician (died 2002)
Olav Torpp, traffic engineer and civil servant (died 1993)

Notable deaths

19 April – Ole Vollan, educator, editor and politician (born 1837)
3 May – Georg Sverdrup, theologian and educator (born 1848)
4 June – Agathe Backer Grøndahl, pianist and composer (born 1847).
8 July – Sophus Bugge, philologist (born 1833)
4 September – Edvard Grieg, composer and pianist (born 1843)
5 September – Adolf Østbye, revue artist, made the first Norwegian gramophone record (born 1868)
11 September – Hans Georg Jacob Stang, politician and Minister (born 1858)

Full date unknown
Hans Hagerup Krag, engineer (born 1829)
Hans Georg Jacob Stang, politician and Prime Minister (born 1830)

See also

References

External links

 
Norway
Norway